MBC Sat is a television channel of the Mauritius Broadcasting Corporation (MBC) broadcast in Mauritius. It was launched on November 13, 2014 after an agreement between Mauritius Broadcasting Corporation and CanalSat Mauritius. It is the first satellite channel by the national TV broadcaster to broadcast via satellite. It also started to diffuse across the Indian Ocean including Mauritius via Parabole during November 2016.

References 

Television channels in Mauritius
Mauritius Broadcasting Corporation